Yonas Malede (or Yunes, ; born 14 November 1999) is an Israeli professional footballer who plays as a forward for Belgian club Mechelen and the Israel national team.

Early life 
Malede was born in Kiryat Bialik, Israel, to an Ethiopian-Jewish family.

Club career 
A Maccabi Netanya youth product, Malede was promoted to the senior team on 24 February 2018 as he made his debut in a league fixture against Maccabi Haifa.

After three seasons with the club, Malede moved to play in the Belgian First Division A as he signed a 4.5-year contract with Gent for a €1.5 million transfer fee.

On 15 June 2022, Malede signed a three-year contract with Mechelen.

International career 
Malede made his debut for Israel national team on 5 June 2021 in a friendly against Montenegro. He started the game and was substituted in the 61st minute with the score at 0–0, the game ended in a 3–1 victory for Israel.

Honours 
Belgian Cup:
Winner (1): 2021–22

References

External links 
IFA Profile

1999 births
Living people
Footballers from Kiryat Bialik
Israeli footballers
Association football forwards
Maccabi Netanya F.C. players
K.A.A. Gent players
K.V. Mechelen players
Israeli Premier League players
Belgian Pro League players
Israel youth international footballers
Israel under-21 international footballers
Israel international footballers
Israeli expatriate footballers
Israeli expatriate sportspeople in Belgium
Expatriate footballers in Belgium
Jewish Israeli sportspeople
Jewish footballers
Israeli people of Ethiopian-Jewish descent